Terry J. Diehl (born November 9, 1949) is an American professional golfer who played on the PGA Tour from 1973 to 1983.

Diehl was born and raised in Rochester, New York.  At the age of 15, he won the international long drive competition when he hit a ball 340 yards. He attended the University of Georgia from 1968 to 1971 and was a member of the golf team, an All-American in 1969. 

Diehl had more than 20 top-10 finishes in PGA Tour events including a win at the 1974 San Antonio Texas Open; he shot a 19-under-par 269 and won by one stroke over Mike Hill. He finished solo second to Lee Trevino at the same tournament in 1980. Diehl finished the 1976 IVB-Bicentennial Golf Classic tied for first in regulation; however, he lost that tournament to Tom Kite on the fifth extra hole of a playoff handing Kite his first of 19 PGA Tour wins. Diehl's best finish in a major championship was a T-7 at the 1977 U.S. Open.

Diehl left the PGA Tour after the 1983 season to pursue other endeavors that included a stint in the PGA Tour's marketing department, a commentator for ESPN, a club pro, a stockbroker with Prudential Securities and a senior vice president in portfolio management at Morgan Stanley in Rochester.

Diehl decided to forgo a chance to play on the Champions Tour after reaching the age of 50, when he and wife Laura decided to adopt a daughter from China named Alexandra. He also has four grown sons named Matt, John, Colin and Graham.

Amateur wins
1967 International Junior Masters (individual medalist)
1969 Monroe Invitational, New York State Amateur
1971 Monroe Invitational

Professional wins (1)

PGA Tour wins (1)

PGA Tour playoff record (0–1)

Results in major championships

Note: Diehl never played in The Open Championship.

CUT = missed the half-way cut
"T" indicates a tie for a place

See also 

 1973 PGA Tour Qualifying School graduates

References

External links

American male golfers
Georgia Bulldogs men's golfers
PGA Tour golfers
Golf writers and broadcasters
Golfers from New York (state)
Sportspeople from Rochester, New York
1949 births
Living people